Coletta Rydzek (born 6 June 1997) is a German cross-country skier.

Rydzek is the sister of Nordic combined skier Johannes Rydzek.

Cross-country skiing results
All results are sourced from the International Ski Federation (FIS).

Olympic Games

World Championships

World Cup

Season standings

References

External links

1997 births
Living people
People from Oberstdorf
Sportspeople from Swabia (Bavaria)
German female cross-country skiers
Cross-country skiers at the 2022 Winter Olympics
Olympic cross-country skiers of Germany